Adam Chorneyko (born August 6, 1988) is a Canadian former professional ice hockey player. He last played for the Heerenveen Flyers of the Eredivisie.

Playing career
Chorneyko played five seasons (2004-2009) of major junior hockey in the Western Hockey League, scoring 35 goals and 75 assists for 110 points, while earning 150 penalty minutes in 250 games played.

Chorneyko played the 2009-10 with the University of Lethbridge under Canadian Interuniversity Sport (CIS), and was recognized for his outstanding play when he was awarded the "University of Alberta Hockey Alumni Trophy" as the CIS (West) Rookie of the Year and named to the CIS (West) Second All-Star Team. Chorneyko immediately turned professional, playing four regular season games and seven playoff games with the Fort Worth Brahmas of the Central Hockey League to conclude their 2009–10 season.

Chorneyko played the 2010–11 season with the Colorado Eagles of the CHL, and remained with the Eagles for the 2011–12 season when they joined the ECHL. On November 16, 2012, Chorneyko signed with the Rapid City Rush of the CHL, but played just four games with team, and on December 14, 2012, he joined the CHL's Arizona Sundogs.

Awards and honours

References

External links

1988 births
Living people
Arizona Sundogs players
Canadian ice hockey left wingers
Colorado Eagles players
Fort Saskatchewan Traders players
Fort Worth Brahmas players
Heerenveen Flyers players
Ice hockey people from Alberta
Kamloops Blazers players
Lethbridge Hurricanes players
Lethbridge Pronghorns ice hockey players
Sportspeople from St. Albert, Alberta
Rapid City Rush players
Saskatoon Blades players
Canadian expatriate ice hockey players in the Netherlands